McNair is a surname. Notable people with the surname include:

Alexander McNair (1775–1826), American politician
Andrew McNair, ringer of the Liberty Bell
Arnold McNair, 1st Baron McNair (1885–1975)
Barbara McNair (1934–2007), African-American singer and actress
Benjamin McNair (born 1974), Australian actor
Bob McNair (1937–2018), American businessman
Buck McNair (1919–1971), Canadian Second World War flying ace
Cal McNair (born 1961), American NFL executive
Chris McNair (1925-2019), American businessman and politician
Craig McNair (born 1975), New Zealand politician
Duncan McNair, British lawyer, activist and author
Eric Archibald McNair (1894–1918), Victoria Cross recipient
Evander McNair (1820–1902), American army officer
Fred McNair (born 1950), American tennis player
Fred McNair (born 1968), American football player
Frederick McNair (disambiguation), multiple people
Frederick V. McNair Jr. (1882–1962), American naval officer 
Gabrial McNair (born 1973), composer
Harold McNair (1931–1971), British saxophonist
Heather McNair, American actress
Ian McNair (1933–2007), Australian market researcher
Janice McNair (born 1936), owner of the Houston Texans
John McNair (congressman) (1800–1861), American politician
John B. McNair (1889–1968), premier of New Brunswick, Canada, from 1940 to 1952
John Frederick Adolphus McNair (1828–1910), British engineer
Lesley J. McNair (1883–1944), American general
Paddy McNair (born 1995), Northern Ireland footballer
Paul D. McNair (born 1959), Canadian non-profit executive
Richard Lee McNair (born 1958), American criminal
Rick McNair (1942–2007), playwright, author, director
Robert Evander McNair (1923–2007), American politician, governor of South Carolina
Robin McNair (1918–1996), British Royal Air Force Second World War fighter pilot and civilian aviation executive
Ronald McNair (1950–1986), physicist and astronaut
Ron McNair (born c. 1950), American politician
Sally McNair (born 1956), British journalist
Steve McNair (1973–2009), American National Football League quarterback
Sylvia McNair (born 1956), American opera singer
Todd McNair (born 1965), American football coach
Winifred McNair (1877–1954), British tennis player
William N. McNair (1880–1948), mayor of Pittsburgh, Pennsylvania from 1934 to 1936

Fictional characters
Tom McNair, a lead character in the British television series Being Human

See also

MacNair
McNair-Wilson

Surnames
Scottish surnames
Surnames of British Isles origin